The Mindoro climbing rat or Mindoro rat (Anonymomys mindorensis) is a species of rodent in the family Muridae.
It is found only in the Philippines, and is known only from Ilong Peak in the Halcon Mountains. It is the only species in the genus Anonymomys.
Its natural habitat is subtropical or tropical dry forest.
It is threatened by habitat loss.

References

Rats of Asia
Old World rats and mice
Endemic fauna of the Philippines
Fauna of Mindoro
Rodents of the Philippines
Mammals described in 1981
Taxonomy articles created by Polbot